Muir Glacier is a glacier in Glacier Bay National Park and Preserve in the U.S. state of Alaska. As recently as the mid-1980s the glacier was a tidewater glacier and calved icebergs from a wall of ice 90 m (200 feet) tall.

The glacier is named after Scottish-born naturalist John Muir, who traveled around the area and wrote about it, generating interest in the local environment and in its preservation. His first two visits were in 1879 (at age 41) and 1880. During the visits, he sent an account of his visits in installments to the San Francisco Bulletin. Later, he collected and edited these installments in a book, Travels in Alaska, published in 1915, the year after he died.

Retreat

Muir Glacier has undergone very rapid, well-documented retreat since its Little Ice Age maximum position at the mouth of Glacier Bay around 1780.

In 1904 the glacier reportedly "broke through the mountains" with Pyramid Peak to the west and Mt. Wright and Mount Case to the east.

Ocean water has filled the valley replacing the ice and creating Muir Inlet.

See also

 List of glaciers

References 

Glaciers of Glacier Bay National Park and Preserve
Glaciers of Hoonah–Angoon Census Area, Alaska
Glaciers of Unorganized Borough, Alaska